Love Songs is an album by the mezzo-soprano Anne Sofie von Otter and the pianist Brad Mehldau.

Background
Carnegie Hall awarded Mehldau a commission to write the song cycle Love Songs for von Otter; they premiered it together in 2009. His music is for love poems – five by Sara Teasdale, and one each by Philip Larkin and E. E. Cummings.

Music and recording
The double album is in two parts: a seven-song cycle written by Mehldau; and songs by Jacques Brel, Michel Legrand, Joni Mitchell, Lennon and McCartney and others, sung in various languages.

Release and reception

Love Songs was released by Naïve Records on November 1, 2010. The BBC reviewer commented that "Von Otter's performances emphasise vocal purity over the content of the verses, giving them a chilly beauty". The AllMusic reviewer's opinion was that von Otter's "tone is full and pure, and her investment in the songs is absolute. Mehldau's exceptionally sensitive and inventive accompaniments contribute immeasurably to the success of the album."

Track listing
Disc 1
"It May Not Always Be So"
"We Met at the End of the Party"
"Child, Child"
"Twilight"
"Because"
"Dreams"
"Did You Never Know?"

Disc 2
"Avec Le Temps"
"Pierre"
"Marcie"
"Something Good"
"Chanson De Maxence"
"Chanson Des Viueux Amants"
"Sakta Vi Ga Genom Stan"
"Att Angora En Brygga"
"Dis, Quand Reviendras-Tu?"
"What Are You Doing the Rest of Your Life?"
"Calling You"
"Blackbird"
"Some Other Time"

Personnel
 Anne Sofie von Otter – vocals
 Brad Mehldau – piano

References

 

Anne Sofie von Otter albums
Brad Mehldau albums
Collaborative albums